Álvaro Gómez Hurtado (May 8, 1919 – November 2, 1995) was a Colombian lawyer, politician, journalist and active member of the Colombian Conservative Party. Gómez was a son of the former President of Colombia, Laureano Gómez. He is mostly remembered for being one of the writers of the Colombian Constitution of 1991, for running three times for the presidency, without success, and for his murder at the hands of the Revolutionary Armed Forces of Colombia. He served separate appointments as ambassador to Switzerland, Italy, the United States and France, beginning in the 1940s.

Early years
Álvaro Gómez was born as the second of four children to Laureano Gómez, a newspaper publisher who later became president of Colombia. His mother was María Hurtado Cajiao.  His siblings are Cecilia, Rafael and Enrique. The family grew up in La Candelaria, a traditional neighborhood of Bogotá. The children attended private schools in Brussels, Belgium and Buenos Aires, Argentina while their father served as a diplomat. After his family's return to Bogotá, Gómez went to the Colegio de San Bartolomé, a preparatory school, graduating in 1936.

He studied law at the Pontifical Xavierian University and graduated as a lawyer in 1941. His thesis was entitled Influencias del Estoicismo en el Derecho Romano ("The Influence of Stoicism in Roman Law").

Journalism
He began writing for the newspaper El Siglo, which was owned by his father. He later founded a weekly business magazine called Síntesis Económica (Economic Synthesis) and created and produced a television news show called Noticiero 24 Horas ("24 Hours News").

Political career

Gómez Hurtado's first political office was as elected councilman for the city of Bogotá. He next ran for the Chamber of Representatives of Colombia and was elected for a four-year term. After finishing his term, he was elected to the Senate.

Gómez was appointed as a "plenipotentiary minister" several times. He was also appointed as Ambassador to the United Nations, Switzerland, Italy, the United States and France.

Presidential candidacies
Gómez founded the National Salvation Movement.  He ran (unsuccessfully) as its candidate for president three times: in 1974 against Alfonso López Michelsen, in 1986 against Virgilio Barco and in 1990 against César Gaviria.

President of the Constituent Assembly
He was elected to the Constituent Assembly, which created the new Colombian Constitution of 1991. He was elected as co-president of the Constituent Assembly along with Horacio Serpa and Antonio Navarro. After the Constitution had been written and ratified, Gómez left politics and focused on journalism and academia.

Kidnapping
In 1988, Gómez was kidnapped by the M-19 guerrillas, and was released after the intervention of Álvaro Leyva.

Assassination
Álvaro Gómez was murdered by gunmen on November 2, 1995 in Bogotá while leaving the Sergio Arboleda University, where he was a Visiting Professor. FARC-EP claimed responsibility for his murder in letter to the Special Justice for Peace (JEP) tribunal in October 2020. In a clandestine book of letters from FARC founder Manuel Marulanda, titled Documentos y Correspondencia Manuel Marulanda Vélez (1993-1998), there are six mentions that the guerrilla committed the magnicide.

However it is important to take into account that the family of Gómez Hurtado stated that it is a strategy to distract the investigation that during the last 25 years has been collecting evidence that might incriminate former president Ernesto Samper Pizano (1994-1998).

Gómez Hurtado was denouncing the financing by the drug cartels of the former president Ernesto Samper's campaign, and they believe that the evidence shows that it was a state crime. Ernesto Samper has been a supporter of peace talks with the FARC guerrilla.

Published work 
La Revolución en América (Revolution in the Americas)
La Calidad de Vida (The Quality of Life)
Soy libre. (I am Free)
Compilación de conferencias dictadas en la Universidad Sergio Arboleda. (Compilation of his lectures at Sergio Arboleda University)

Marriage and family
Álvaro Gómez was married to Margarita Escobar López and had three children: Mauricio, Mercedes and Álvaro José.

Notes

References
 El Diario del Otun newspaper; Alvaro Gomez Hurtado
 El Colombiano newspaper; 1991
 Colombialink.com: Alvaro Gomez Hurtado biography

1919 births
1995 deaths
People from Bogotá
Children of presidents of Colombia
Members of the Chamber of Representatives of Colombia
Members of the Senate of Colombia
Presidential Designates of Colombia
Ambassadors of Colombia to Switzerland
Ambassadors of Colombia to Italy
Ambassadors of Colombia to France
Ambassadors of Colombia to the United States
Colombian journalists
Male journalists
Colombian academics
Colombian Conservative Party politicians
Burials at Central Cemetery of Bogotá
Members of the Constituent Assembly of Colombia
20th-century journalists